The Global XML Web Services Architecture (GXA) was an announcement by Microsoft in 2002 of several proposals for extensions to SOAP. Some of the components of GXA were developed into standards in combination with other companies, including IBM. Others were specific to Microsoft and have been superseded. Microsoft released a reference implementation of a part of GXA as Web Services Enhancements 1.0 SP1 for Microsoft .NET (WSE).

Components of GXA in WSE 1.0
WS-Security
WS-Routing
WS-Policy
XML Infoset

GXA Future Directions
At the time of the GXA announcement, Microsoft listed further standards they were participating in developing:

Federated security: WS-Trust, WS-Privacy, WS-Federation, WS-SecureConversation, WS-Policy

Pervasive metadata and discovery: WS-Referral

Microsoft also announced they were working on distributed agreement (transaction) standards.

See also
List of Web service specifications
Web Services Interoperability

References

Further reading
GXA (Global XML Architecture) at serviceoriented.org

GXA Defines Framework for Web Services from Directions On Microsoft, Sep 23 2002

XML-based standards
Microsoft software